Tetrapogon is a genus of grasses.

The name Tetrapogon derives from the Greek roots tetra- and pogon, meaning "four" and "beard", respectively, in reference to the tufts of hairs on the plant. The species in this genus are distributed across Africa and through the Middle East as far east as India.

 Species
 Tetrapogon bidentatus Pilg. -  Tanzania, Kenya
 Tetrapogon cenchriformis (A.Rich.) Pilg. - Africa + Arabia from Cape Verde to Saudi Arabia to Tanzania
 Tetrapogon ferrugineus (Renvoize) S.M.Phillips - Ethiopia, Kenya, Somalia
 Tetrapogon tenellus Chiov. - India
 Tetrapogon tetrastachys Hack. ex Hook.f. - Indian Subcontinent; Arabian Peninsula; Africa from Djibouti to Mpumalanga
 Tetrapogon villosus Desf. -  - Africa + southwest Asia from Canary Islands to Turkmenistan to Uganda

 formerly included
see Chloris 
 Tetrapogon flabellatus - Chloris flabellata
 Tetrapogon mossambicensis - Chloris mossambicensis 
 Tetrapogon tetrastachys - Chloris montana

References

Chloridoideae
Poaceae genera